A biodiversity hotspot is a biogeographic region with significant levels of biodiversity that is threatened by human habitation. Norman Myers wrote about the concept in two articles in The Environmentalist in 1988  and 1990, after which the concept was revised following thorough analysis by Myers and others into “Hotspots: Earth’s Biologically Richest and Most Endangered Terrestrial Ecoregions” and a paper published in the journal Nature, both in 2000.

To qualify as a biodiversity hotspot on Myers' 2000 edition of the hotspot map, a region must meet two strict criteria: it must contain at least 1,500 species of vascular plants (more than 0.5% of the world's total) as endemics, and it has to have lost at least 70% of its primary vegetation. Globally, 36 zones qualify under this definition. These sites support nearly 60% of the world's plant, bird, mammal,  reptile, and amphibian species, with a high share of those species as endemics. Some of these hotspots support up to 15,000 endemic plant species, and some have lost up to 95% of their natural habitat.

Biodiversity hotspots host their diverse ecosystems on just 2.4% of the planet's surface. Ten hotspots were originally identified by Myer; the current 36 used to cover more than 15.7% of all the land but have lost around 85% of their area. This loss of habitat is why approximately 60% of the world's terrestrial life lives on only 2.4% of the land surface area. Caribbean Islands like Haiti and Jamaica are facing serious pressures on the populations of endemic plants and vertebrates as a result of rapid deforestation. Other areas include the Tropical Andes, Philippines, Mesoamerica, and Sundaland, which, under the current levels at which deforestation is occurring, will likely lose most of their plant and vertebrate species.

Hotspot conservation initiatives
Only a small percentage of the total land area within biodiversity hotspots is now protected. Several international organizations are working to conserve biodiversity hotspots.
 Critical Ecosystem Partnership Fund (CEPF) is a global program that provides funding and technical assistance to nongovernmental organizations in order to protect the Earth's richest regions of plant and animal diversity, including biodiversity hotspots, high-biodiversity wilderness areas and important marine regions.
 The World Wide Fund for Nature has devised a system called the "Global 200 Ecoregions", the aim of which is to select priority ecoregions for conservation from fourteen terrestrial, three freshwater, and four marine habitat types. They are chosen for species richness, endemism, taxonomic uniqueness, unusual ecological or evolutionary phenomena, and global rarity. All biodiversity hotspots contain at least one Global 200 Ecoregion.
 Birdlife International has identified 218 “Endemic Bird Areas” (EBAs) each of which holds two or more bird species found nowhere else. Birdlife International has identified more than 11,000 Important Bird Areas all over the world.
 Plant life International coordinates programs aiming to identify and manage Important Plant Areas.
 Alliance for Zero Extinction is an initiative of scientific organizations and conservation groups who co-operate to focus on the most threatened endemic species of the world. They have identified 595 sites, including many Birdlife’s Important Bird Areas.
 The National Geographic Society has prepared a world map of the hotspots and ArcView shapefile and metadata for the Biodiversity Hotspots including details of the individual endangered fauna in each hotspot, which is available from Conservation International.
 The Compensatory Afforestation Management and Planning Authority (CAMPA) seeks to control the destruction of forests in India.

Distribution by region

North and Central America
 California Floristic Province (8)
 Madrean pine–oak woodlands (26)
 Mesoamerica (2)
 North American Coastal Plain (36)

The Caribbean
 Caribbean Islands (3)

South America 
 Atlantic Forest (4)
 Cerrado (6)
 Chilean Winter Rainfall-Valdivian Forests (7)
 Tumbes–Chocó–Magdalena (5)
 Tropical Andes (1)

Europe
 Mediterranean Basin (14)

Africa
 Cape Floristic Region (12)
 Coastal Forests of Eastern Africa (10)
 Eastern Afromontane (28)
 Guinean Forests of West Africa (11)
 Horn of Africa (29)
 Madagascar and the Indian Ocean Islands (9)
 Maputaland-Pondoland-Albany (27)
 Succulent Karoo (13)

Central Asia
 Mountains of Central Asia (31)

South Asia
 Eastern Himalaya (32)
 Indo-Burma, Bangladesh, India and Myanmar (19)
 Western Ghats and Sri Lanka (21)

Southeast Asia and Asia-Pacific
 East Melanesian Islands (34)
 New Caledonia (23)
 New Zealand (24)
 Philippines (18)
 Polynesia-Micronesia (25)
 Eastern Australian temperate forests (35)
 Southwest Australia (22)
 Sundaland, Indonesia and Nicobar islands of India (16)
 Wallacea of Indonesia (17)

East Asia
 Japan (33)
 Mountains of Southwest China (20)

West Asia
 Caucasus (15)
 Irano-Anatolian (30)

Critiques of "Hotspots"
The high profile of the biodiversity hotspots approach has resulted in some criticism. Papers such as Kareiva & Marvier (2003) have argued that the biodiversity hotspots:

 Do not adequately represent other forms of species richness (e.g. total species richness or threatened species richness).
 Do not adequately represent taxa other than vascular plants (e.g. vertebrates and fungi).
 Do not protect smaller scale richness hotspots.
 Do not make allowances for changing land use patterns. Hotspots represent regions that have experienced considerable habitat loss, but this does not mean they are experiencing ongoing habitat loss. On the other hand, regions that are relatively intact (e.g. the Amazon basin) have experienced relatively little land loss, but are currently losing habitat at tremendous rates.
 Do not protect ecosystem services.
 Do not consider phylogenetic diversity.

A recent series of papers has pointed out that biodiversity hotspots (and many other priority region sets) do not address the concept of cost. The purpose of biodiversity hotspots is not simply to identify regions that are of high biodiversity value, but to prioritize conservation spending. The regions identified include some in the developed world (e.g. the California Floristic Province), alongside others in the developing world (e.g. Madagascar). The cost of land is likely to vary between these regions by an order of magnitude or more, but the biodiversity hotspot designations do not consider the conservation importance of this difference. However, the available resources for conservation also tend to vary in this way.

See also

 
 
 
 
 
 
 
 : biodiversity hotspots in the open sea

References

Further reading
 Dedicated issue of Philosophical Transactions B on Biodiversity Hotspots.  Some articles are freely available.
 Spyros Sfenthourakis, Anastasios Legakis: Hotspots of endemic terrestrial invertebrates in Southern Greece. Kluwer Academic Publishers, 2001

External links
 A-Z of Areas of Biodiversity Importance: Biodiversity Hotspots
 Conservation International's Biodiversity Hotspots project
 African Wild Dog Conservancy's Biodiversity Hotspots Project
 Biodiversity hotspots in India
 New biodiversity maps color-coded to show hotspots
 Shapefile of the Biodiversity Hotspots (v2016.1)

Biodiversity
International environmental organizations
Environmental conservation